Napoleon (1769–1821) was a French military leader and emperor.

Napoleon Bonaparte may also refer to:
 Napoléon Charles Bonaparte (1802–1807), prince of Holland and son of Napoleon I's brother Louis
 Napoléon Louis Bonaparte (1804–1831), king of Holland and son of Napoleon I's brother Louis
 Prince Napoléon Bonaparte (1822–1891), son of Napoleon I's brother Jerome
 Napoléon Charles Bonaparte, 5th Prince of Canino (1839–1899), grandson of Napoleon I's brother Lucien
 Napoleon Bonaparte (fictional detective), a character created by Arthur Upfield
 Napoleon Bonaparte (police officer) (born 1965), Indonesian police officer

See also 
 Bonaparte (disambiguation)
 List of French privateers named for Napoleon Bonaparte
 Napoleon (disambiguation)
 Napoleon Bonaparte Buford (1807–1883), U.S. Army officer and railroad executive
 Napoleon Bonaparte Brown (1834–1910), American businessman and politician
 Napoleon Bunny-Part, 1956 Bugs Bunny cartoon